Elizabeth W. Stone (June 21, 1918 – March 6, 2002) was an American librarian and educator and president of the American Library Association from 1981 to 1982. In 1988 she was awarded Honorary Membership in the American Library Association.

Stone received her master's degree in library science in 1961 from the Catholic University of America. She joined the faculty of the Catholic University of America that same year.  She went on to get her doctorate in public administration from the American University in 1968 and was named chair of Catholic University's Department of Library Science in 1972. The department became a School of Library and Information Science in 1981 and she retired  in 1983.

After her retirement, she was an advocate for continuing education of librarians and served as the librarian and archivist of the National Presbyterian Church where her husband had been a minister for 25 years.

References

 

1918 births
2002 deaths
American librarians
American women librarians
Presidents of the American Library Association
Catholic University of America School of Library and Information Science faculty
Catholic University of America alumni
American University alumni
20th-century American women
20th-century American people
American women academics